Below are select minor league players and the rosters of the minor league affiliates of the Minnesota Twins:

Players

David Banuelos

David Clemente Banuelos (born October 1, 1996) is an American professional baseball catcher in the Minnesota Twins organization.

Banuelos attended Damien High School in La Verne, California, graduating in 2014. As a senior, he batted .395 with four home runs and 24 RBIs. Undrafted out of high school in the 2014 MLB draft, he enrolled at California State University, Long Beach, and played college baseball for the Long Beach State Dirtbags. He became the Dirtbags' starting catcher as a sophomore in 2016. During the summer of 2016, he played collegiate summer baseball for the Bellingham Bells of the West Coast League. In 2017, he batted .289 with seven home runs and 29 RBIs and was named a First-Team All-American by Baseball America and one of three finalists for the Johnny Bench Award.

The Seattle Mariners selected Banuelos in the fifth round of the 2017 Major League Baseball draft. He signed with the Mariners, receiving a $300,000 signing bonus, and made his professional debut with the Everett AquaSox, where he spent his first professional season, posting a .236 batting average with four home runs and 26 RBIs in 36 games.

On December 6, 2017, in an attempt to sign Shohei Ohtani during the 2017–18 offseason, the Mariners traded Banuelos to the Minnesota Twins for $1 million in international signing bonus money. He spent the 2018 season with the Cedar Rapids Kernels, batting .220 with two home runs and 22 RBIs in 73 games.

Banuelos begin 2019 with Cedar Rapids before being promoted to the Fort Myers Miracle in May. Over 63 games, he slashed .177/.232/.263 with two home runs and twenty RBIs. He did not play a minor league game in 2020 since the season was cancelled due to the COVID-19 pandemic.

Nolan Blackwood

Nolan Blackwood (born March 16, 1995) is an American professional baseball pitcher in the Minnesota Twins organization.
 
Blackwood attended Southaven High School in Southaven, Mississippi, where he developed his side-arm delivery, saying, "In high school one day, I was having arm issues. My elbow kept bothering me, and my high school coach said, 'Hey, drop it down and just see how it feels and see how you do.' My first bullpen [session] I threw like that, I think I threw like 90 percent strikes." He would help lead the school to a state championship in 2013 as a senior, allowing just a single run in 39 2/3 innings.
 
Blackwood went on to attend the University of Memphis where he set a program record for appearances as a freshman (31) following that up with a program record in saves as a sophomore (14). In 2015, he played collegiate summer baseball with the Hyannis Harbor Hawks of the Cape Cod Baseball League. Blackwood spent three years at Memphis finishing his career with 24 saves, a 7–9 record, a 2.32 ERA, and 77 strikeouts in 116.1 innings.
 
Blackwood was drafted by the Oakland Athletics as a 16th round pick in the 2016 MLB Draft. Blackwood spent the majority of his season in A-ball with five appearances for the Vermont Lake Monsters and 13 appearances for the Beloit Snappers finishing with 25 strikeouts in 26.1 innings and a 2–2 record with a 3.26 ERA in his first pro season. He spent the full 2017 season with the High-A Stockton Ports where he held batters to a .205 average, made 19 saves in 20 opportunities, and struck 48 batters out compared to 18 walks. He finished the year with a 1–5 record and 3.00 ERA.
 
He started the 2018 campaign with the Double-A Midland RockHounds in the Oakland organization, however the Athletics would trade him to the Detroit Tigers along with a player to be named later (eventually Logan Shore) for Mike Fiers. Blackwood played six games in the Tigers organization with the AA Erie SeaWolves and finished 2018 with a 6–4 record and 4.13 ERA over 45 AA appearances in the Oakland and Detroit organizations. Starting the 2019 season with the Triple-A Toledo Mud Hens, Blackwood made just three appearances giving up seven earned runs in three innings. He returned to Erie where he had a career-low ERA (1.76) and career-high in strikeouts (61), more than in any other full season. He held batters to just a .211 average and struck out 61 in 66.1 innings. He would also finish with a 6–4 record while earning four saves.

Blackwood did not play in a game in 2020 due to the cancellation of the minor league season because of the COVID-19 pandemic. He returned to Toledo in 2021, registering a 5-0 record and 4.92 ERA with 51 strikeouts in 60.1 innings pitched across 37 appearances. He spent the 2022 season with Toledo as well, pitching in 44 games and logging a 2-1 record and 3.81 ERA with 38 strikeouts in 49.2 innings of work. He elected free agency following the season on November 10, 2022.

On February 3, 2023, Blackwood signed a minor league contract with the Minnesota Twins organization.

Matt Canterino

Matthew James Canterino (born December 14, 1997) is an American professional baseball pitcher in the Minnesota Twins organization.

Canterino grew up in Southlake, Texas and attended Carroll Senior High School. He was named the District 7-6A Pitcher of the Year as a senior after posting 7-1 record with 57 strikeouts and an 0.64 ERA.

Canterino played college baseball for the Rice Owls, where he was a starting pitcher for three seasons. He was named first team All-Conference USA after going 7-5 with 3.06 ERA and 116 strikeouts against 22 walks in 94 innings. As a junior, he went 6-5 with a 2.81 ERA and 121 strikeouts in 99.1 innings pitched and was named the Conference USA Pitcher of the Year in addition to repeating as a first team all-conference selection. In 2018, he played collegiate summer baseball with the Falmouth Commodores of the Cape Cod Baseball League, and was named a league all-star.

Canterino was selected in the 2nd round of the 2019 MLB draft by the Minnesota Twins. After signing with the team, he was initially assigned to the Gulf Coast League Twins before being promoted to the Class-A Cedar Rapids Kernels of the Midwest League. He did not play a minor league game in 2020 since the season was cancelled due to the COVID-19 pandemic. He pitched only 23 innings in 2021 due to injury.

He was assigned to the Double-A Wichita Wind Surge to begin the 2022 season. In 34.1 innings pitched, he posted a 1.83 ERA and 1.14 WHIP with 50 strikeouts and 22 walks. On August 10, 2022, it was announced that Canterino would need Tommy John surgery, causing him to miss the remainder of the 2022 season and likely all of the 2023 season.

Canterino was optioned to Double-A Wichita to begin the 2023 season.

Rice Owls bio

Keoni Cavaco

Keoni Kealakekua Cavaco (born June 2, 2001) is an American professional baseball shortstop in the Minnesota Twins organization.

Cavaco attended Eastlake High School in Chula Vista, California. In 2019, his senior year, he hit .433 with eight home runs and 16 steals along with pitching to a 0.67 ERA. He committed to play college baseball at San Diego State University.

Cavaco was drafted by the Minnesota Twins in the first round with the 13th overall selection of the 2019 Major League Baseball draft. He signed for $4.05 million. After signing, he was assigned to the Rookie-level Gulf Coast League Twins with whom he spent all of his first professional season. Over 25 games, he hit .172 with one home run and six RBIs. He did not play a minor league game in 2020 since the season was cancelled due to the COVID-19 pandemic. For the 2021 season, he was assigned to the Fort Myers Mighty Mussels of the Low-A Southeast, slashing .233/.296/.301 with two home runs and 24 RBIs over sixty games. He returned to Fort Myers for the 2022 season. Over 99 games, he hit .231 with 11 home runs and 59 RBIs.

David Festa

David Festa (born March 8, 2000) is an American professional baseball pitcher in the Minnesota Twins organization.

Festa Seton Hall Preparatory School in West Orange, New Jersey and played college baseball at Seton Hall University. He was drafted by the Minnesota Twins in the 13th round of the 2021 Major League Baseball Draft.

Festa spent his first professional season with the Florida Complex League Twins and Fort Myers Mighty Mussels. He started 2022 with Fort Myers before being promoted to the Cedar Rapids Kernels.

Brent Headrick

Brent Wayne Headrick (born December 17, 1997) is an American professional baseball pitcher in the Minnesota Twins organization.

Headrick played college baseball at Illinois State University. He was drafted by the Minnesota Twins in the ninth round of the 2019 Major League Baseball draft.

The Twins added Headrick to their 40-man roster after the 2022 season. Headrick was optioned to the Triple-A St. Paul Saints to begin the 2023 season.

Michael Helman

Michael James Helman (born May 23, 1996) is an American professional baseball infielder and outfielder in the Minnesota Twins organization.

Helman attended Pius X High School in Lincoln, Nebraska where he played baseball and basketball. After graduating in 2015, he played two years of college baseball at Hutchinson Community College. As a sophomore in 2017, he batted .487 with 111 hits, 17 home runs, and 73 RBIs over sixty games and was named National Junior College Player of the Year. He transferred to Texas A&M University for the 2018 season where he started 62 games and hit .369 with six home runs, 36 RBIs, and 12 stolen bases. After the season, he was selected by the Minnesota Twins in the 11th round of the 2018 Major League Baseball draft.

Helmand signed with the Twins and split his first professional season between the Elizabethton Twins and Cedar Rapids Kernels, batting .361 with four home runs over 39 games between the two teams. He spent the 2019 season with the Fort Myers Miracle where he hit .197 over 82 games, missing the end of the season after breaking his arm. He did not play a game in 2020 due to the cancellation of the minor league season. Helman returned to Cedar Rapids for the 2021 season and batted .246 with 19 home runs, 57 RBIs, and 21 stolen bases over 111 games. He opened the 2022 season with the Wichita Wind Surge before he was promoted to the St. Paul Saints. Over 135 games between the two clubs, he slashed .258/.337/.423 with twenty home runs, sixty RBIs, and forty stolen bases.

Helman's cousin, Joel Makovicka, played in the NFL.

Texas A&M Aggies bio

Will Holland

William Christopher Holland (born April 18, 1998) is an American professional baseball shortstop in the Minnesota Twins organization.

Holland graduated from Collins Hill High School in Suwanee, Georgia. As a senior, he hit .436 with two home runs and 13 stolen bases. Undrafted out of high school in the 2016 Major League Baseball draft, he enrolled at Auburn University to play college baseball for the Auburn Tigers.

As a freshman at Auburn in 2017, Holland batted .209 with three home runs and 18 RBIs in 45 games. He was named the SEC Freshman of the Week for the week of March 13–19 after going 6 for 15 at the plate, hitting one home run with four RBIs and three runs scored. He played in the Perfect Game Collegiate Baseball League that summer. In 2018, as a sophomore, Holland had a breakout year in which he slashed .313/.406/.530 with 12 home runs and 52 RBIs in 66 games. He was named to the All-SEC Second Team and to the ABCA All-South Region Team. After the season, he played in the Cape Cod Baseball League for the Hyannis Harbor Hawks along with playing for the USA Baseball Collegiate National Team. Prior to the 2019 season, Holland was named a preseason All-American by multiple outlets including Perfect Game and D1Baseball.com. He struggled his junior year, finishing the season batting .246 with nine home runs and 35 RBIs over 64 games.

Holland was selected by the Minnesota Twins in the fifth round of the 2019 Major League Baseball draft, and he signed for $575,000. He made his professional debut with the Elizabethton Twins of the Rookie-level Appalachian League, batting .192 with seven home runs, 16 RBIs, and eight stolen bases over 36 games. He did not play a minor league game in 2020 since the season was cancelled due to the COVID-19 pandemic. For the 2021 season, Holland was assigned to the Fort Myers Mighty Mussels of the Low-A Southeast, slashing .214/.336/.401 with ten home runs, 27 RBIs, and 19 stolen bases over 76 games. He was assigned to the Cedar Rapids Kernels of the High-A Midwest League to begin the 2022 season. In early August, he was promoted to the Wichita Wind Surge of the Double-A Texas League. Over 116 games between the two teams, he slashed .227/.339/.366 with nine home runs, 49 RBIs, and 32 stolen bases.

Auburn Tigers bio

Marco Raya

Marco Antonio Raya (born August 7, 2002) is an American professional baseball pitcher in the Minnesota Twins organization.

Raya attended United South High School in Laredo, Texas, where he played baseball. He committed to play college baseball at Texas Tech. He was selected by the Minnesota Twins in the fourth round with the 128th overall selection of the 2020 Major League Baseball draft. He signed with the team for $410,000.

Raya did not play a game in 2020 due to the cancellation of the minor league season, and did not play in 2021 due to lingering shoulder issues. Raya made his professional debut in 2022 with the Fort Myers Mighty Mussels. He missed a brief period during the season after getting his wisdom teeth removed. Over 19 games (17 starts) with Fort Myers, he went 3-2 with a 3.05 ERA and 76 strikeouts over 65 innings.

Emmanuel Rodríguez

Emmanuel Rodríguez (born February 28, 2003) is a Dominican professional baseball outfielder in the Minnesota Twins organization

Rodríguez signed with the Minnesota Twins as an international free agent in July 2019. He didn't make his professional debut until 2021 with the Florida Complex League Twins, due to the Minor League Baseball season being cancelled due to the Covid-19 Pandemic.

Rodríguez played in 47 games for the Fort Myers Mighty Mussels before suffering a season-ending torn meniscus.

José Salas

José Antonio Salas (born April 15, 2003) is an American professional baseball infielder in the Minnesota Twins organization.

Salas signed with the Miami Marlins as an international free agent in July 2019.

Salas made his professional debut in 2021 with the Florida Complex League Marlins, before being promoted to the Jupiter Hammerheads after 28 games. He started 2022 with Jupiter, before his promotion to the Beloit Sky Carp.

Several of Salas's relatives have also played Minor League Baseball.

On January 20, 2023, Salas, Pablo López, and Byron Chourio were traded to the Minnesota Twins for Luis Arráez.

Tanner Schobel

Tanner Schobel (born June 4, 2001) is an American baseball shortstop who plays in the Minnesota Twins organization.

Schobel grew up in Williamsburg, Virginia and attended Walsingham Academy. He began playing for the school's varsity baseball team in the eighth grade. Schobel played summer collegiate baseball after graduating high school for the Peninsula Pilots of the Coastal Plain League.

Schobel started all 52 of Virginia Tech's games during his freshman season and batted .279 with seven home runs, ten doubles, 33 RBIs, and 36 runs scored. After the 2021 season he played for the Bourne Braves of the Cape Cod Baseball League. As a sophomore, Schobel hit .362 with 19 home runs and 74 RBIs.

Schobel was selected in the Competitive Balance section of the second round of the 2022 Major League Baseball draft.

Virginia Tech Hokies bio

Austin Schulfer

Austin Schulfer (born December 22, 1995) is an American professional baseball pitcher in the Minnesota Twins organization.

Schulfer played college baseball for the Milwaukee Panthers for four seasons. As a senior, he went 6-5 with a 2.96 ERA in 14 starts.

Schulfer was selected in the 19th round of the 2018 MLB draft by the Minnesota Twins. After signing with the team, he was assigned to the Elizabethton Twins of the Rookie-level Appalachian League, where he went 3-0 with a 1.58 ERA in 11 appearances with seven starts. Schulfer spent the 2019 season with the Class-A Cedar Rapids Kernels of the Midwest League and went 7-6 with a 3.96 ERA and 124 strikeouts in  innings pitched. He did not play a minor league game in 2020 due to the cancellation of the minor league season caused by the COVID-19 pandemic. Schulfer played for the Double-A Wichita Wind Surge in 2021 and had a 6-8 record with a 4.34 ERA in 24 starts. He returned to Wichita at the beginning of the 2022 season and was moved to a role as a relief pitcher. He made 15 appearances and had a 0.39 ERA before earning a promotion to the Triple-A St. Paul Saints.

Milwaukee Panthers bio

Yunior Severino

Yunior Severino (born October 3, 1999) is a Dominican baseball infielder in the Minnesota Twins organization.

Severino originally signed with the Atlanta Braves as an international free agent in July 2016. He played his first professional season in 2017 with the Dominican Summer League Braves and Gulf Coast Braves. After the season, he was declared a free agent after the Braves were penalized for violations in the international free agent market. Shortly after, he signed with the Minnesota Twins.

In his first year with the Twins in 2018, Severino played with the Elizabethton Twins. He played for the Gulf Coast Twins and Cedar Rapids Kernels in 2019. He did not play for a team in 2020 due to the Minor League Baseball season being cancelled because of the Covid-19 pandemic. Severino returned in 2021 to play for the Fort Myers Mighty Mussels and Cedar Rapids. He played 2022 with Cedar Rapids and Wichita Wind Surge.

Minor League affiliate rosters

Triple-A

Double-A

High-A

Single-A

Rookie

Foreign Rookie

References

Minor league players
Lists of minor league baseball players